The 1990 Atlantic Coast Conference men's basketball tournament took place in Charlotte, North Carolina, at the second Charlotte Coliseum. Georgia Tech won the tournament, defeating Virginia, 70–61, in the championship game. Brian Oliver of Georgia Tech was named tournament MVP. This was the only time both teams in the ACC Tournament final have been from outside the state of North Carolina until the 2021 ACC finals matchup between Florida State and Georgia Tech.

Bracket

AP rankings at time of tournament

External links
 

Tournament
ACC men's basketball tournament
College sports in North Carolina
Basketball competitions in Charlotte, North Carolina
ACC men's basketball tournament
ACC men's basketball tournament